St Stephen Walbrook is a church in the City of London, part of the Church of England's Diocese of London. The present domed building was erected  to the designs of Sir Christopher Wren following the destruction of its medieval predecessor in the Great Fire of London in 1666.  It is located in Walbrook, next to the Mansion House, and near to Bank and Monument Underground stations.

Early history
The original church of St Stephen stood on the west side of the street today known as Walbrook and on the east bank of the Walbrook,  once an important fresh water stream for the Romans running south-westerly across the City of London from the City Wall near Moorfields to the Thames. The original church is thought to have been built directly over the remains of a Roman Mithraic Temple following a common Christian practice of hallowing former heathen sites of worship.

The church was moved to its present higher site on the other side of Walbrook Street, still on the east side of the River Walbrook (later diverted and concealed in a brick culvert running under Walbrook Street and Dowgate Hill on a straightened route to the Thames), in the 15th century. In 1429 Robert Chichele, acting as executor of the will of the former Lord Mayor, William Standon, had bought a piece of land close to the Stocks Market (on the site of the later Mansion House) and presented it to the parish. Several foundation stones were laid at a ceremony on 11 May 1429, and the church was consecrated ten years later, on 30 April 1439.

The church was destroyed in the Great Fire of London in 1666. It contained a memorial to the composer John Dunstaple. The wording of the epitaph had been recorded in the early 17th century, and was reinstated in the church in 1904, some 450 years after his death. The nearby church of St Benet Sherehog, also destroyed in the Great Fire, was not rebuilt; instead its parish was united with that of St Stephen.

Wren's church

The present building was constructed between 1672 and 1679 to a design by Sir Christopher Wren, at a cost of £7,692. The mason was Thomas Strong brother of Edward Strong the Elder and the spire is by Edward Strong the Younger. It is rectangular in plan,  with a dome and an attached north west tower.  Entry to the church is up a flight of sixteen steps, enclosed in  a porch  attached to the west front. Wren also designed a porch for the north side of  the church. This was never built,  but there once was a north door, which was bricked up in 1685, as it let in the offensive smells from the slaughterhouses in the neighbouring Stocks Market.
The walls, tower,  and internal columns   are made of stone, but the dome is of timber and plaster with an external covering of copper

The circular base of the dome is not carried, in the conventional way, by pendentives formed above the arches of the square, but on a circle formed by eight arches that spring from eight of the twelve columns, cutting across each corner in the manner of the Byzantine squinch. This all contributes to create what many consider to be one of Wren's finest church interiors. Sir Nikolaus Pevsner lists it as one of the ten most important buildings in England.

The contemporary carved furnishings of the church, including the altarpiece and Royal Arms, the pulpit and font cover, are attributed to the carpenters Thomas Creecher and Stephen Colledge, and the carvers William Newman and Jonathan Maine.

In 1760 a new organ was provided by George England.

In 1776 the central window in the east wall was bricked up to allow for the installation of Devout Men Taking Away the Body of St Stephen, a painting by Benjamin West, which  the rector, Thomas Wilson, had commissioned for the church.  The next year Wilson set up in the church a statue of Catharine Macaulay, (then still alive) whose political ideas he admired.  It was removed after protests.  The east  window was unblocked, and the picture moved to the north wall, during extensive restorations in 1850.

Recent history

The church suffered slight damage from bombing during the London Blitz of 1941 and was later restored. In 1954, the united parishes of St Mary Bothaw and St Swithin London Stone (merged in 1670) were themselves united with the parish of St Stephen.

The church was designated a Grade I listed building on 4 January 1950.

In 1953 the Samaritans charity was founded  by the rector of St Stephen's, Dr Chad Varah. The first Samaritans branch (known as Central London Branch) operated from a crypt beneath the church before moving to Marshall Street in Soho. In tribute to this, a telephone is preserved in a glass box in the church. The Samaritans began with this telephone, and today the voluntary organisation staffs a 24-hour telephone hot-line for people in emotional need.

In 1987, as part of a major programme of repairs and reordering, a massive white polished stone altar commissioned from the sculptor Henry Moore by churchwarden Peter Palumbo was installed in the centre of the church. Its unusual positioning required the authorisation of a rare judgement of the Court of Ecclesiastical Causes Reserved. In 1993 a circle of brightly coloured kneelers designed by Patrick Heron was added around the altar.

Benjamin West's  Devout men taking away the body of St Stephen, previously hung on the north interior wall, was put into storage following the reordering. This decision was controversial, as the initial removal of the painting was illegal. In 2013 the church was given permission to sell the painting to a foundation, despite opposition from the London Diocesan Advisory Committee for the Care of Churches, and by the Church of England's Church Buildings Council. Prior to the painting's export, a temporary export bar was placed on it to give it a last chance to stay in the UK. The foundation has since loaned it to the Museum of Fine Arts in Boston, which has undertaken restoration work on the painting.

On 14 July 1994, the church was the venue for the wedding of Lady Sarah Armstrong-Jones to Daniel Chatto.

At the time of his retirement in 2003, at the age of 92, Dr Chad Varah was the oldest serving incumbent in the Church of England.

Rectors

Peter 1301–1302 
Hugh de Marny 1315
Willian de Stansfield 1325–1327
Thomas Blundell 1350–1359
Robert Eleker 1351–1385
John Brown 1391–1395
John Horewood 1395–1396
Henry Chichele 1396–1397. Later Archbishop of Canterbury
John Horewood 1397–1400
John Beachfount 1400–1403
Radman died 1419
William Rock 1422. Resigned
Thomas Southwell 1428–1440
William Trokill 1440–1474
Robert Rous 1474–1479
William Sutton 1479–1502 
John Young 1502
John Kite 1522–1534
Elisha Bodley 1534
Thomas Becon
William Ventris 1554–1556
Henry Pendleton 1556–1557
Humphrey Busby 1557–1558
Philip Pettit 1563 or 1564
John Bendale 1563 or 1564
Henry Wright 1564–1572
Henry Trippe 1572–1601
Roger Fenton 1601–1616
Thomas Muriel 1615–1625
Aaron Wilson 1625–1635
Thomas Howell 1635–1641
Michael Thomas 1641–1642
Thomas Warren 1642
Thomas Watson 1642–1662. Sequestered.
Robert Marriott 1662–1689
William Stonestreet 1689–1716
Joseph Rawson 1716–1719
Joseph Watson 1719–1737
Thomas Wilson 1737–1784
George S. Townely 1784–1835
George Croly 1835–1861. Also a poet and novelist.
William Windle 1861–1899
Robert Stuart de Corcy Laffan 1899–1927 
Charles Clark 1927–1940
Frank Gillingham 1940–1953
Chad Varah 1953–2003
Peter Delaney 2004–2014. As priest in charge
Jonathan Evens 2015–2018. As priest in charge
Stephen Baxter 2018–

Burials
John Dunstaple
Sir Rowland Hill, first Protestant Lord Mayor of London
Elizabeth Jekyll (1624-1653) diarist
John Vanbrugh

The nearest London Underground station is Bank.

Gallery

See also

 List of churches and cathedrals of London
 List of Christopher Wren churches in London

Notes

References

External links

 St Stephen Walbrook's parish website
 Church of England's St Stephen Walbrook page
 St Stephen Walbrook
 History of the Samaritans
 360° panorama inside St Stephen Walbrook

Christopher Wren church buildings in London
Church of England church buildings in the City of London
17th-century Church of England church buildings
English Baroque church buildings
Church buildings with domes
Rebuilt churches in the United Kingdom
Diocese of London
Grade I listed churches in the City of London
Churches in the City of London